Alison Elliot CBE FRSE (born 27 November 1948) is an honorary fellow at New College, Edinburgh. She was the former Associate Director of the Centre for Theology and Public Issues at the University of Edinburgh, Scotland. In 2004 she became the first woman ever to be elected Moderator of the General Assembly of the Church of Scotland. An elder and session clerk at Greyfriars Kirk in Edinburgh, she was also the first non-minister to hold this post since George Buchanan in 1567.

Background and education 
Alison Elliot was born in Edinburgh in 1948. She was educated at Bathgate Academy, the University of Edinburgh and the University of Sussex.

Career 
Her professional career is in psychology, but her public profile has been chiefly through her church work. She was Research Associate in the Department of Linguistics at the University of Edinburgh 1973–1974, then lecturer in psychology at the University of Lancaster 1974–1976 and at the University of Edinburgh 1977–1985. She is the author of two publications: Child Language (1981) and The Miraculous Everyday (2005).

She served as Convener of the Committee on Church and Nation of the General Assembly of the Church of Scotland 1996–2000, as well as Session Clerk at Greyfriars Kirk in Edinburgh. She was involved in building ecumenical relations, and was a member of the Central Committee of the Conference of European Churches (CEC) 2003-2009 (and also moderated CEC's Assembly held in Lyon, France, in July 2009). She played a key role in Action of Churches Together in Scotland. In 2004 she was elected Moderator of the General Assembly of the Church of Scotland and was the first woman to be elected to that post. The OBE was conferred upon her for her ecumenical work.

In 2016, she became only the third person to receive the Scottish Public Service Awards' Lifetime Achievement Award.

She is a founding board member of the Palestine Festival of Literature. Since 2007 she has been Convener of the Scottish Council for Voluntary Organisations.

In 2018 she became General Secretary of The Royal Society of Edinburgh, of which she has been a Fellow since 2008.

Family 
She is married to John Elliot; they live in Edinburgh. They have two children.

Artistic recognition

In 2004 the Scottish National Portrait Gallery commissioned a portrait of Elliot by Jennifer McRae.

References

See also 
 General Assembly of the Church of Scotland
 List of Moderators of the General Assembly of the Church of Scotland

Living people
1948 births
Moderators of the General Assembly of the Church of Scotland
Alumni of the University of Sussex
Alumni of the University of Edinburgh
Academics of the University of Edinburgh
Academics of Lancaster University
Commanders of the Order of the British Empire
Scottish psychologists
Scottish women psychologists
Scottish Presbyterians
Elders of the Church of Scotland
Scottish women academics